Matthew James Redman (born 14 February 1974) is an English Christian worship leader, singer-songwriter and author. Redman has released 16 albums, written 8 books, and helped start three church-plants. He is best known for his two-time Grammy Award-winning single, "10,000 Reasons (Bless the Lord)". Co-written with Jonas Myrin, the single reached No. 1 on the US Billboard Christian Songs chart in 2012.

Career

Christian church leadership 

Redman was converted to Christianity at the age of 10 and attended the Anglican church of St Andrew's Chorleywood, in Hertfordshire. It was there he learned to play guitar, and at the age of 20, he began leading worship services and released his first album. In 1993, Redman helped found Soul Survivor, a global Christian movement and yearly music festival aimed at youth alongside his pastor Mike Pilavachi. From 1994 until 2002 Redman led worship services for Soul Survivor Church in Watford, England.

In 2002, after a sabbatical in America to record Where Angels Fear to Tread, Redman moved to Brighton. In 2004 he and his wife joined a new church plant, The Point, in West Sussex, led by pastor Will Kemp.

In 2008, Redman, along with his wife Beth and their three children, moved to Atlanta, Georgia, to help plant Passion City Church with Louie Giglio and Chris Tomlin. In August 2010, they returned to the UK with their children.

Music 
Matt recorded his first album, Wake Up My Soul, at ICC studios in January and February 1994. The album had an impressive line-up of Christian musicians including Iona's Mike Haughton, percussionist Martin Neil, Split Level's Adrian Thompson, Helen Burgess and Les Moir on bass, and was produced by Martin Smith.

In 2002, Redman co-wrote with his wife Beth, the 2002 Dove Award-winning "Blessed Be Your Name" (Worship Song of the Year) and the Grammy Award-nominated "Our God." Since then, Matt and Beth have co-created some of Redman's most successful songs including, "You Never Let Go", "Face Down" and "Let My Words Be Few".

In February 2011, Redman joined Chris Tomlin, Louie Giglio, and Nathan and Christy Nockels at LIFT – A Worship Leader Collective where his 2011 live album, 10,000 Reasons, was recorded. On 28 July 2012, "10,000 Reasons (Bless the Lord)", the title track of Redman's new album, topped the Billboard Christian Songs chart, where it stayed for 13 weeks. It was his first No. 1 hit on American Contemporary Christian radio. The single went on to win two Grammy Awards, for Best Contemporary Christian Music Song and Best Gospel/Contemporary Christian Music Performance and was certified Gold by RIAA in 2018. Matt has also won thirteen Gospel Music Association's Dove Awards.

The album's success came immediately after Matt Redman and LZ7, a Manchester-based Christian rap and urban music group, released the song "Twenty Seven Million" on 27 February 2012, to raise awareness for the anti-human trafficking movement. The record, charted on the UK Singles Chart reaching No. 12. Redman toured internationally with the band, to raise awareness for the cause through worship.

Redman's songs have been covered by a number of contemporary Christian music (CCM) artists including Matt Maher, Michael W. Smith, Jeremy Camp, Rebecca St. James, Chris Tomlin, David Crowder Band, Tree63, Kutless, Stellar Kart, and Hillsong United. He has regularly collaborates with other Christian musicians including Chris Tomlin and Tim Hughes.

In 2019, Redman announced he had signed with Integrity Music, with new music coming in late 2019, and a new album in 2020.

Writing 
He has authored and edited multiple books on Christian worship, including The Unquenchable Worshipper and the book Facedown which accompanied the album of the same name. He and his wife co-wrote the book titled "Blessed Be Your Name" with the hopes to bring others to trust God and his goodness, no matter the circumstance.

Personal life 

Redman was born and raised in Watford, England. The family had moved to a small commuter town named Chorleywood when he was around the age of two. His father died when he was just seven years old, and he and his brother were raised predominantly by his mother. His mother later remarried into an abusive relationship that took a great toll on the family. At the age of 10, he converted to Christianity after attending a mission service by Luis Palau at London's QPR football stadium and was encouraged by Mike Pilavachi, an Anglican church youth leader to lead worship in his teens.

He married Beth Redman, who is also a songwriter and author. The couple has five children.

Discography

Albums

Studio albums

Live albums

Compilation albums

Video albums and DVDs
2004: Facedown (DVD)

Singles

Appearances
Collaborations on Passion event albums
2000: "Did You Feel The Mountains Tremble?" on The Road to OneDay
2003: "O Come Let Us Adore Him" / "Come Let Us Return to the Lord" and "Blessed Be Your Name" on Sacred Revolution: Songs From OneDay 03
2004: "Father Let Me Dedicate" / "Here Is Love" on Passion: Hymns Ancient and Modern
2006: "You Never Let Go" on Everything Glorious
2008: "God of Our Yesterdays" / "Shine" / "Dancing Generation" on God of This City
2010: "You Alone Can Rescue" on Passion: Awakening
2011: "Set Free" (jointly with Chris Tomlin) on Passion: Here for You 
2012: "Lay Me Down" (jointly with Chris Tomlin) / "10,000 Reasons (Bless the Lord)" on Passion: White Flag
2013: "Jesus, Only Jesus" / 	"Shout" (jointly with Chris Tomlin) on Passion: Let the Future Begin
2014: "Mercy" / "Worthy" on Passion: Take It All

Appearances on Passion Live and Passion compilation albums
2000: OneDay: Live
2005: How Great Is Our God
2006: The Best of Passion (So Far)
2007: Live from Passion 07 Pt. 2

Awards
Grammy Award wins
2013: Best Contemporary Christian Music Song – "10,000 Reasons (Bless the Lord)"
2013: Best Gospel/Contemporary Christian Music Performance – "10,000 Reasons (Bless the Lord)"

Dove Award wins
2005: Worship Song of the Year: "Blessed Be Your Name"
2006: Praise and Worship Album of the Year: Blessed Be Your Name: The Songs of Matt Redman Vol. 1
2007: Children's Music Album of the Year: VeggieTales Worship Songs
2007: Special Event Album of the Year: Passion: Everything Glorious
2009: Special Event Album of the Year: Passion: God of This City
2011: Worship Song of the Year – TIE: "Our God"
2011: Special Event Album of the Year: Passion: Awakening
2013: Song of the Year: "10,000 Reasons (Bless the Lord)"
2013: Contemporary Christian Performance of the Year: "10,000 Reasons (Bless the Lord)"
2013: Songwriter of the Year

Church of England
2016: Cranmer Award for Worship, "for his contribution to the worship life of the Church"

Published books
 The Unquenchable Worshipper (2001)
 Where Angels Fear to Tread (2002)
 The Heart of Worship Files (2003)
 Facedown (2004)
 Inside Out Worship (2005)
 Blessed Be Your Name (with Beth Redman) (2005)
 Mirror Ball (2011)
 10,000 Reasons: Stories of Faith, Hope, and Thankfulness Inspired by the Worship Anthem (with Craig Borlase) (2017)

Notes

References

External links
 

1974 births
Living people
English pop guitarists
English male guitarists
English evangelicals
British performers of Christian music
Christian music songwriters
English songwriters
Performers of contemporary Christian music
Performers of contemporary worship music
Grammy Award winners
Sixstepsrecords artists
People from Chorleywood
21st-century British guitarists
21st-century British male musicians
British male songwriters